One More Chance is a 2005 drama short film directed by American actor, writer and producer Darrell M. Smith and co-produced by actor Jacques Derosena. It was one of the finalists of the 2005 Gotham City Short Film Festival of John Coogan.

Plot 
Finding work when you have just got out of prison is hard — especially acting work.

Devon, an ex-convict recently released from prison, is trying to take back his life and find a job but has many problems with the prejudices and rejection of the society. Jean-Paul is a French manic depressive who has to deal with the accusations made by his ex-wife. 
When these two characters met, they become friends and eventually decide to go on a journey in order to help each other solve their problems.

Cast 
Darrell M. Smith as Devon
Jacques Derosena as Jean-Paul
Caroline Tomas as 	Marla
Bill White as Uncle Joe
Todd Hunt as Craig
Joana Vargas as the Caretaker

Notes

External links

2005 short films
2005 films
American short films
2000s English-language films